Telipna aurivillii is a butterfly in the family Lycaenidae. It is found in the Democratic Republic of the Congo and Uganda.

Subspecies
Telipna aurivillii aurivillii (north-eastern Zaire)
Telipna aurivillii jefferyi Jackson, 1969 (western Uganda)

References

Butterflies described in 1914
Poritiinae
Taxa named by Hans Rebel